"Soul Bossa Nova" is a popular instrumental, composed and first performed by musician and record producer Quincy Jones. It appeared on his 1962 Big Band Bossa Nova album on Mercury Records.

Jones said that it took him twenty minutes to compose the piece, which features prominently a cuíca (responsible for the distinctive "laughing" in the first bars). Roland Kirk was the flute soloist, Lalo Schifrin was the pianist, Chris White was the bassist, Rudy Collins was the drummer, and Jerome Richardson was the alto flutist. The album liner notes do not specify the brass players.

Media use
The song is used in the films The Pawnbroker and Take the Money and Run.
The theme was used in a long-running Canadian television game show, Definition. 
Canadian hip hop group Dream Warriors sampled the title heavily for their popular track "My Definition of a Boombastic Jazz Style", in their debut album And Now the Legacy Begins in 1991. 
Canadian comedian Mike Myers used the song as the theme for his James Bond parody film series Austin Powers. The song was recommended to Myers by KCRW DJ Chris Douridas, who had been hired on the film as a music consultant.
It was used as a theme for the 1998 FIFA World Cup. 
It was sampled by Ludacris for his Austin Powers-themed single, "Number One Spot".
In 2014, Jones executive produced Canadian jazz singer Nikki Yanofsky's album Little Secret, which featured a song entitled "Something New". The song interpolated melodic references to "Soul Bossa Nova".
The song is used as the menu music of the 2007 Gameloft Game, Las Vegas Nights: Temptations in The City 
It was used as an act of humour magic show on America's Got Talent and Britain's Got Talent.
A version of the song was used as the title theme in the German comedy show Was guckst du?!.
 In 2022 Canadian cellular provider Telus used the music for a TV commercial.

References

1962 songs
Songs written by Quincy Jones
1960s instrumentals
Quincy Jones songs
Austin Powers